Safēd Kōh (white mountains in Persian) may refer to:
 Spīn Ghar, a mountain range along the Afghanistan Pakistan border
 Selseleh-ye Safīd Kūh, a mountain range in northwestern Afghanistan